WIB may refer to:

 Western Indonesian Time
 Workforce Investment Board, to promote workforce investment in US-associated places
 War Industries Board, US, World War I
 WiB (Digital Terrestrial Television)
 WIB (Waktu Indonesia Bercanda), Indonesian comedy show hosted by Cak Lontong now known as Peristawa
 WIB (Waktu Indonesia Belanja), an end-of-month shopping program by Tokopedia